Epilacydes simulans is a moth of the family Erebidae. It was described by Arthur Gardiner Butler in 1875. It is found in Cameroon, the Democratic Republic of the Congo, Egypt, Equatorial Guinea and Namibia.

References

 Arctiidae genus list at Butterflies and Moths of the World of the Natural History Museum

Spilosomina
Moths described in 1875
Moths of Africa